The Kosovar Supercup is an annual football match played between the winners of the previous season's Kosovo Superleague and Kosovar Cup competitions. The match is played since 1992, and is recognized by UEFA since 2016. Ballkani are the defending champions.

Finals by year

2020–2029

Titles

By team

League-and-Cup Doubles

Notes and references

Notes

References

External links
 
Kosovar Supercup at RSSSF

 
1992 establishments in Kosovo
Recurring sporting events established in 1992
Kosovo